Carl Lester Olsson (August 18, 1909 – July 2, 1972) was an American football offensive lineman in the National Football League (NFL) for the Boston/Washington Redskins.  He attended Mercer University.

After his playing career, Olsson was the football head coach for 25 years at Akron Manchester High School.

References

External links
 
 

1909 births
1972 deaths
Players of American football from Akron, Ohio
American football offensive guards
American football offensive tackles
Mercer University alumni
Boston Redskins players
Washington Redskins players